Takrawlek Dejrath or alternatively spelled Takorlek Dejarat (born April 24, 1972 –) is a Thai retired Muay Thai fighter and professional boxer from Nakhon Ratchasima, who competed in fighting during 1990s.

Career
Dejrath was born in Ban Takraw, Dan Khun Thot District (currently in Thepharak District), Nakhon Ratchasima Province, northeastern region in Muay Thai fighter family. His father owned a small Muay Thai gym. So he trained in fighting when he was only seven years old and competed in local events for only 50–100 baht. His older brother is also a famous Muay Thai fighter Chatchainoi Chaoraioi.

He traveled to Bangkok for Muay Thai fighting without any hope of becoming a champion, but merely wishing to continue his studies. He has come to live at Surat Sianglor (same trainer as Payao Poontarat)'s Muay Thai gym where the fighters will have the opportunity to study together with fighting.

He started out with regular fights at the Siam Om Noi Stadium, before moving on to major arena Lumpinee and Rajadamnern Stadiums. He fights in the lightest weight class category of 105–108 pounds.

Although Dejrath never won any titles, he was only ranked 105–108 pounds of the Lumpinee and Rajadamnern Stadiums. But he was known as a fighter with fierce fighting style, precise and heavy punches as well as kicks to the opponent's ankle violently (known in Thai cho-yang–เจาะยาง, "tire puncturing"). He has faced many great fighters such as Saenmuangnoi Lukchaopormahesak, Thongchai Tor.Silachai, Jakphet Keatchaiyong, Rittidej Sor.Ploenchit and Payaklek Sor.Ploenchit. Especially in the fight against Payaklek Sor.Ploenchit in November 1991 at the Lumpinee Stadium, he won TKO in the 3rd round with elbow strikes. This bout was regarded as the best fight of the year of the Lumpinee Stadium. 

On March 27, 1992, he won by knockout with fist in the first round against Pimaran Sitaran, the older brother of Pimaranlek Sitaran (Somluck Kamsing), the first Thai Olympic gold medalist.

He also changed style to professional boxing in 1991 and 1993, a total of 6 fights, 5 wins (2 on knockouts), 1 lost by knockout. His only defeat came on August 18, 1993, in the event organized by Sombhop Srisomvongse at the Channel 7's studio, by losing in second round knockout to Eric Chávez, a veteran Filipino whom held the IBF Mini flyweight world title for a short time between 1989–90.

Post retirement
Takrawlek Dejrath retired at the age of 24 after graduating with a bachelor's degree in Physical Education from Chandrakasem Rajabhat Institute (now Chandrakasem Rajabhat University). The highest value he got was 80,000 baht.

He came to work at a real estate company in Lat Phrao neighbourhood. He continued to work from the start as an employee until eventually becoming an executive.

Personal life, he is married and has two children. His daughter has been an amateur Muay Thai fighter and won a youth championship.

Currently, Dejrath owned a Muay Thai school in Bangkok include being an assistant coach for the Thai national amateur boxers as well.

And he also has a business selling Kai yang (Thai grilled chicken), which is his own chicken marinade recipe.

Muay Thai record

|- style="background:#c5d2ea;"
| 1996-05-12 || Draw ||align=left| Banchadej Kiatmuangtrang|| Rajadamnern Stadium || Bangkok, Thailand || Decision || 5|| 3:00

|- style="background:#cfc;"
| 1994-12-22 || Win ||align=left| Kaopong Pinsinchai|| Lumpinee Stadium || Bangkok, Thailand || KO (Punches)|| 1||

|- style="background:#cfc;"
| 1994-04-14 || Win ||align=left| Kongpatapee Majestic|| Lumpinee Stadium || Bangkok, Thailand || Decision || 5|| 3:00

|- style="background:#fbb;"
| 1994-02-08 || Loss ||align=left| Jakrapet Kiatchaiyong|| Lumpinee Stadium || Bangkok, Thailand || TKO (Punches)|| 5||

|-  style="background:#cfc;"
| 1992-10-13 || Win ||align=left| Rattanachai Woraphon || Lumpinee Stadium || Bangkok, Thailand || Decision || 5 || 3:00

|-  style="background:#cfc;"
| 1992-07-31 || Win||align=left| Dokmaifai Tor.Sitthichai|| Lumpinee Stadium || Bangkok, Thailand || KO (Punches)|| 1 ||

|-  style="background:#cfc;"
| 1992-04-17 || Win||align=left| Sakchai Wongwianyai || Lumpinee Stadium || Bangkok, Thailand || Decision || 5 || 3:00

|-  style="background:#cfc;"
| 1992-03-27 || Win||align=left| Pimaran Sitaran || Lumpinee Stadium || Bangkok, Thailand || KO (Punches)|| 1 ||

|-  style="background:#cfc;"
| 1992-02-25 || Win||align=left| Payaklek Sor.Ploenchit || Lumpinee Stadium || Bangkok, Thailand || KO (Punches) || 2 || 

|-  style="background:#cfc;"
| 1991-11-12 || Win||align=left| Payaklek Sor.Ploenchit || Lumpinee Stadium || Bangkok, Thailand || KO (Elbow) || 3 || 

|-  style="background:#fbb;"
| 1991-07-19 || Loss ||align=left| Pongsak Lukbanyai || Lumpinee Stadium || Bangkok, Thailand || Decision || 5 || 3:00

|-  style="background:#fbb;"
| 1991-06-11 || Loss ||align=left| Singdam Or.Ukrit || Lumpinee Stadium || Bangkok, Thailand || Decision || 5 || 3:00

|-  style="background:#cfc;"
| 1991-02-14 || Win||align=left| Chainoi Sitchunthong || Lumpinee Stadium || Bangkok, Thailand || TKO (Doctor stoppage)|| 3 ||

|-  style="background:#cfc;"
| 1990-12-30 || Win||align=left| Surin Wittayasasubsawat || Channel 7 Stadium || Bangkok, Thailand || Decision || 5 || 3:00

|-  style="background:#;"
| 1990-10-02 || ||align=left| Surin Wittayasasubsawat || Lumpinee Stadium || Bangkok, Thailand || ||  || 

|-  style="background:#fbb;"
| 1990-06-22 || Loss ||align=left| Samson Isan || Lumpinee Stadium || Bangkok, Thailand || Decision || 5 || 3:00

|-  style="background:#cfc;"
| 1990-05-17 || Win||align=left| Panthong Na Pattaya || Rajadamnern Stadium || Bangkok, Thailand || Decision || 5 || 3:00

|-  style="background:#fbb ;"
| 1990- || Loss ||align=left| Thongchai Tor.Silachai || Lumpinee Stadium || Bangkok, Thailand || Decision || 5 || 3:00

|-  style="background:#cfc;"
| 1990-03-21 || Win||align=left| Rittidet Sor.Ploenchit || Lumpinee Stadium || Bangkok, Thailand || KO (Punches)|| 3 ||

|-  style="background:#fbb;"
| 1990- || Loss ||align=left| Thongchai Tor.Silachai || Lumpinee Stadium || Bangkok, Thailand || Decision || 5 || 3:00

|-  style="background:#fbb;"
| 1988-01-01 || Loss ||align=left| Denthoranee Ekamon || Lumpinee Stadium || Bangkok, Thailand || Decision || 5 || 3:00

|-
| colspan=9 | Legend:

References

External links

People from Nakhon Ratchasima province
Thai male Muay Thai practitioners
Thai male boxers
Muay Thai trainers
Living people
1972 births
Boxing trainers
Light-flyweight boxers